Two Rivers is a census-designated place (CDP) in Fairbanks North Star Borough, Alaska, United States.  It lies between mile 13 (the Little Chena River) and mile 25 (the Chena River) on the Chena Hot Springs Road, northeast of Fairbanks. As of the 2010 United States Census, the CDP had a population of 719, up from 482 in 2000.

Geography
Two Rivers is located at  (64.862366, -147.098884).

Two Rivers has a subarctic climate (Dfc) showing signs of seasonal lead, with June being warmer than August and May being warmer than September. Summers are warm and rainy, coupled with cool nights, while winters are severely cold and snowy, with annual snowfall averaging 62 inches (157 cm).

|Jan rain inch = 0.62	
|Feb rain inch = 0.43	
|Mar rain inch = 0.32	
|Apr rain inch = 0.42	
|May rain inch = 0.93	
|Jun rain inch = 2.14	
|Jul rain inch = 3.03	
|Aug rain inch = 3.18	
|Sep rain inch = 1.93	
|Oct rain inch = 0.93	
|Nov rain inch = 0.66	
|Dec rain inch = 0.49

|Jan snow inch = 10.8	
|Feb snow inch = 7.3	
|Mar snow inch = 5.8	
|Apr snow inch = 2.6	
|May snow inch = 0.7	
|Jun snow inch = 0	
|Jul snow inch = 0	
|Aug snow inch = 0	
|Sep snow inch = 1.2	
|Oct snow inch = 11.6	
|Nov snow inch = 12.7	
|Dec snow inch = 9

|Jan record high F = 58	
|Feb record high F = 49	
|Mar record high F = 59	
|Apr record high F = 77	
|May record high F = 86	
|Jun record high F = 91	
|Jul record high F = 92	
|Aug record high F = 89	
|Sep record high F = 75	
|Oct record high F = 74	
|Nov record high F = 50	
|Dec record high F = 47

|Jan record low F = -55	
|Feb record low F = -59	
|Mar record low F = -36	
|Apr record low F = -20	
|May record low F = -3	
|Jun record low F = 22	
|Jul record low F = 30	
|Aug record low F = 27	
|Sep record low F = 14	
|Oct record low F = -27	
|Nov record low F = -45	
|Dec record low F = -52

|Jan precipitation days = 7	
|Feb precipitation days = 5	
|Mar precipitation days = 4	
|Apr precipitation days = 3	
|May precipitation days = 8	
|Jun precipitation days = 12	
|Jul precipitation days = 15	
|Aug precipitation days = 17	
|Sep precipitation days = 13	
|Oct precipitation days = 10	
|Nov precipitation days = 8	
|Dec precipitation days = 7

|source 1 = WRCC
}}

Demographics

Two Rivers first appeared on the 1980 U.S. Census as a census-designated place (CDP).

As of the census of 2000, there were 482 people, 177 households, and 124 families residing in the CDP.  The population density was 16.9 people per square mile (6.5/km2).  There were 192 housing units at an average density of 6.7/sq mi (2.6/km2).  The racial makeup of the CDP was 88.59% White, 0.21% Black or African American, 2.70% Native American, 2.49% Asian, 0.83% from other races, and 5.19% from two or more races.  1.24% of the population were Hispanic or Latino of any race.

There were 177 households, out of which 40.7% had children under the age of 18 living with them, 59.9% were married couples living together, 6.2% had a female householder with no husband present, and 29.9% were non-families. 24.9% of all households were made up of individuals, and 1.7% had someone living alone who was 65 years of age or older.  The average household size was 2.72 and the average family size was 3.19.

In the CDP the population was spread out, with 31.1% under the age of 18, 6.2% from 18 to 24, 34.6% from 25 to 44, 26.6% from 45 to 64, and 1.5% who were 65 years of age or older.  The median age was 34 years. For every 100 females there were 120.1 males.  For every 100 females age 18 and over, there were 119.9 males.

The median income for a household in the CDP was $58,571, and the median income for a family was $58,661. Males had a median income of $45,500 versus $21,736 for females. The per capita income for the CDP was $24,351.  None of the families and none of the population were living below the poverty line, including no under eighteens and none of those over 64.

Economy
Most Two Rivers residents who are not self-employed work in Fairbanks, North Pole or the area's military installations, Eielson Air Force Base and Fort Wainwright.  Businesses in Two Rivers include one general store, restaurants, a post office, a laundromat and the former HIPAS Observatory, which closed in 2011.

Most people who move to Two Rivers are attracted by the rural nature of the community and the extensive network of trails in the area.  The trail system is popular with dog sled mushers, horseback, snowmachine, motorcycle and ATV riders, hunters, hikers, and others.  Two Rivers borders the extensive Chena River State Recreation Area.

Two Rivers is especially popular with both recreational and professional dog sled mushers.  Sled dogs outnumber humans in Two Rivers by about 4 to 1.  Notable Two Rivers mushers include 5-time Iditarod Trail Sled Dog Race Champion Rick Swenson, the first Yukon Quest International Sled Dog Race champion, Sonny Lindner, and only woman to win that race, Aliy Zirkle (2000) and her husband Allen Moore who won the 2013 Yukon Quest making them the only husband and wife team to have both won the race. In February, Two Rivers hosts a checkpoint for the Yukon Quest.

References

Census-designated places in Fairbanks North Star Borough, Alaska